A Love Supreme (also known as ALS) is a Sunderland AFC fanzine, first published in 1989.

Fanzine 
A Love Supreme is an independent fanzine created for the supporters of English football club Sunderland AFC, written by the fans, for fans. The first issue was launched on March 21, 1989, when Sunderland played Chelsea at Roker Park. Since then, ALS have published almost 300 issues of the fanzine, selling over two million copies.

A Love Supreme has been named UK Fanzine of the Year on nine separate occasions by Total Football Magazine, Shoot Magazine, the Football Supporters Association and Football Pools, as well as Best Premier League Publication (Online). ALS has also been named North East Publication of the Year at the North East Press Awards on two occasions and employs several full-time staff. Prominent contributors include Sobs, Aidan Crowe, Ian Mole, Giles Mooney, Michael Conroy, Daniel McCallum, Sean Mackie, Lewys Carr and Alex Miller. The magazine is edited by Martyn McFadden and Sobs.

Headquarters and Shop 
A Love Supreme has its base opposite the Stadium of Light, where its staff design the magazine, update their website, social media and sell their own range of fan related merchandise.

A Love Supreme also provide fan coach travel to every SAFC away game and have done so since 1998. In that time they have transported fans to the biggest stadiums and games in the country, including four trips to Wembley Stadium for various cup finals.At ALS HQ the fanzine shares the building with Merch Bitch and the Roker End Café. Merch Bitch supply A Love Supreme with all their fan related merchandise, which is sold exclusively in store, online and on stalls outside the SOL on matchdays. The Fan Shop and Café are open Monday to Friday 9-5 and on all matchdays.

The ALS HQ has been a place for camera crews too, whether that's conducting interviews inside the building, or even a short clip of the shutters opening. Several interviews in the Sunderland Netflix series Sunderland 'Til I die take place in the interior of the ALS HQ.

Liverpool FC media channel Redmen TV have used the building too when filming a Jordan Henderson documentary. At ALS they interviewed former Sunderland player Kevin Ball and ALS editor Sobs.

ALS Books 
ALS have published 37 SAFC fan related books, including the Mackem Dictionary, written by Paul Swinney. The Mackem Dictionary which documents common words used in Sunderland/Wearside. It was created to raise funds for the SAFC charity, The Foundation of Light. To promote the book, the Foundation of Light got several first team players to go through some of the words in the book.

Music 
ALS have been involved in various football related music projects. The first was Ain’t No Stopping Us Now, SAFC’s official release when they reached the 1992 FA Cup Final against Liverpool. The song featured the first team squad and was released on A Love Supreme Records.

Next up was Cheer Up Peter Reid in 1996, which sold 40,000 copies and peaked at 41 in the UK charts, and was number one in the NME Indie Charts. The proceeds of Cheer Up Peter Reid were donated to cancer charities. The story became so popular that they appeared on The Big Breakfast with Peter Andre.

Then came Niall Quinn’s Disco Pants, which ALS self-released on their own record label. It reached number one in the NME Indie Charts. The singles were followed up by the album Mackem Music, which featured the above-mentioned releases and various SAFC related songs from over the years.

Anti Racism and Charity Work 
ALS have been long time campaigners against racism in football.

In 1989 they handed out 10,000 anti racism stickers to SAFC fans outside Roker Park.

In 1992 they released an anti racism t-shirt of which all proceeds went to Show Racism The Red Card. The shirts were modelled by SAFC players Gary Bennett, Phil Gray and Don Goodman. Gary Bennett was awarded an MBE for services to anti-racism in football and also given freedom to the city of Sunderland.ALS editors accepted an invitation from Sunderland City Council to become ambassadors for Sunderland in 2017 and also sit on the Development Board of the club's charity, The Foundation Of Light.
On World Mental Health Day in 2019, A Love Supreme worked in partnership with the Mind charity, who help raise awareness for mental health. The project was called ‘Goals Worth Talking About’ which allowed fans to vote for their team’s favourite goal, which was then immortalised as street art in their respective cities. In this case, the goal voted to be recreated was from Carlos Edwards against Burnley in 2007 at the Stadium of Light, which helped seal Sunderland's promotion back to the Premier League.

Starting in Sunderland, working south through Leeds, Preston, West Bromwich, Cardiff, Bristol and ending at Leyton Orient, eight pieces of individual art have been produced in locations near the club stadiums.

Former Staff 
Many ALS staff and contributors have developed their skills at the fanzine and then gone on to have successful careers in football media. ALS Founder Jeremy Robinson left ALS to report full time on SAFC for the Sunday Sun. Jonathan Wilson contributed to and sold ALS outside Roker Park and went on to write for The Independent, FourFourTwo, The Guardian and The Observer. His books, Inverting the Pyramid and Angels with Dirty Faces both won Best Football Book awards. He has also won FSA Football Writer of the Year in 2012, 2017 and 2021.

Philip Buckingham is now Football News Reporter for TheAthleticUK. Adam Capper left ALS to work in the Media Department at SAFC before joining West Ham United, closely followed by Sam Lightle, who worked in digital media at SAFC and is now at Everton FC. The Sunderland Echo’s SAFC reporters Phil Smith and Chris Young also worked at ALS before moving on to the local paper…

Peter Oliver now works for RTL, but he formerly worked for ALS before joining the entertainment brand. In 2021 Peter returned to Sunderland to speak to the younger generation about his career.

References

External links
Official website

1989 establishments in England
Association football magazines
Sports magazines published in the United Kingdom
Fanzines
Magazines established in 1989
Sunderland A.F.C.